"Raised on It" is a song co-written and recorded by American country music singer Sam Hunt. It was released independently, and was later included on his debut studio album Montevallo (2014).

Critical reception
Matt Bjorke of Roughstock reviewed the single favorably, saying that "The song may mentioned trucks and parties but it’s more about the roots and youthful lifestyle than trying to have a girl slide over on a bench seat or to get so washed out in party land that nothing else can be taken from the lyrics."

Music video
The music video premiered in August 2013 on Hunt's independent YouTube channel. The music video features Hunt heading to Georgia to hang out with friends and family.

Chart performance

Certifications

References

2013 singles
Sam Hunt songs
Songs written by Sam Hunt
Songs written by Zach Crowell
2013 songs
Song recordings produced by Shane McAnally
Songs written by Jerry Flowers